Stef is a given name or nickname, and a surname. Notable people and characters with the name include:

People with the name

Given name or nickname
 Stef Bos (born 1961), Dutch singer
 Stef Blok (born 1964), Dutch politician, Minister for Housing and the Central Government Sector
 Stef Kamil Carlens (born 1970), Belgian singer for Zita Swoon
 Stephen Carpenter (born 1970), American guitarist for Deftones
 Steph Carse (born 1966), French-Canadian pop singer formerly credited as Stef Carse
 Stef Chura (born 1988), American indie rocker
 Stef Clement (born 1982), Dutch road bicycle racer
 Stef Curtis (born 1983), English footballer
 Stef Doedée (born 1987), Dutch football goalkeeper
 Stef Driesen (born 1966), Belgian artist
 Stef Dusseldorp (born 1989), Dutch racing driver
 Stef Nijland (born 1988), Dutch footballer
 Stef Peeters (born 1992), Belgian footballer
 Stef Penney (born 1969), Scottish novelist and short-film director
 Stef Wertheimer (born 1926), Israeli entrepreneur, industrialist and politician
 Stef Wijlaars (born 1988), Dutch footballer
 Stef Wils (born 1982), Belgian footballer

Surname
 Claudia Ștef (born 1978), Romanian race walker

Fictional characters
 Stef Adams Foster, a main character in the American TV series The Fosters, played by Teri Polo
 Stef Djordjevic, protagonist of the film All the Right Moves (1983), played by Tom Cruise
Stephanie "Stef" Steinbrenner, a protagonist in the film The Goonies, played by Martha Plimpton

See also
Steff
Steffl
Stephan (given name)
Stephanie

Lists of people by nickname
Dutch masculine given names
Hypocorisms
Given names